Leaves from the Theatre of War is the title of a series of 250 ink drawings by Nabil Kanso. The works were done at various intervals between 1980 and 1992.

References

External links
Drawings
Leaves from the theatre of War
Selection of Works

20th-century drawings
Military art
War art
1980s works
Works by Nabil Kanso